Cearfoss is an unincorporated community and census-designated place in northwestern Washington County, Maryland, United States. Its population was 178 as of the 2010 census. Cearfoss is located northwest of Hagerstown and Maugansville, near the Pennsylvania border. Many highways intersect in Cearfoss in a roundabout, including Maryland routes 58, 63 and 494. Cearfoss is officially included in the Hagerstown Metropolitan Area (Hagerstown-Martinsburg, MD-WV Metropolitan Statistical Area).

Geography 

Demographics

References 

Unincorporated communities in Washington County, Maryland
Unincorporated communities in Maryland
Census-designated places in Washington County, Maryland
Census-designated places in Maryland